Breive is a village in Bykle municipality in Agder county, Norway. The small village has a handful of residences, mainly farms. The village grew up around two farmsteads that have been in use since before the 1600s.

References

Villages in Agder
Bykle